That Summer is a 1965 novel by political novelist Allen Drury which chronicles melodrama among the elite in the California town of Greenmont. It was first published in the United Kingdom by Michael Joseph, and then by Coward-McCann in the United States in 1966.

The 1967 Dell paperback edition featured the tagline, "the new Peyton Place of the California monied set, by the Pulitzer Prize-winning author of Advise and Consent".

References

1965 American novels
Novels by Allen Drury
Novels set in California
Michael Joseph books
Coward-McCann books